= Manitoba 100 =

Canadian historical documentary television series

- Genre: Documentary
- Written by: Eric Wells
- Narrated by: Maurice Burchell
- Country of origin: Canada
- Original language: English
- No. of seasons: 1
- No. of episodes: 5

Production
- Producer: Don Robertson

Original release
- Network: CBC Television
- Release: 17 July – 10 September 1970

Manitoba 100 is a Canadian historical documentary television miniseries that aired on CBC Television in 1970.

== Premise ==
This five-episode series was produced in Winnipeg as a project for Manitoba's provincial centennial with Maurice Burchell was the narrator.

== Scheduling ==
The half-hour episodes were broadcast on Fridays at 11:25 p.m. (Eastern) from 17 July to 14 August 1970, and rebroadcast on Thursdays at 10:00 a.m. from 13 August to 10 September 1970.

== Summary ==
An historical documentary was based on the origins and stories of the people of Manitoba from the Indians, the Metis through the immigration of Icelandic, Mennonite, Ukrainian and others in 1970.

== Episodes ==
1. "A Blot On The Horizon" recounted the earliest exploration of the Manitoba region
2. "New Horizons" featured the region's settlement including the Hudson's Bay fur trade in which English and French were rivals
3. "Tarnished Sunset" described the 1870 establishment of Manitoba as a Canadian province
4. "Destiny" covered Manitoba's first 40 years as a province
5. "Boom Or Bust" was an overview Manitoba's history after 1910
